Grane is an offshore oil field in the North Sea located  west of the city of Haugesund on the western coast of Norway. It is Norway's first heavy crude oil production field and Statoil's largest heavy oil field in the Norwegian continental shelf. The oil from the field, located in Block 25/11 is transported to Sture terminal via Grane oil pipeline. The injection gas is imported to Grane oil field from the Heimdal, located just north the field.

Ownership
The Grane field is operated by Statoil. Statoil holds 38%, Petoro – 30%, ExxonMobil – 25.60%, ConocoPhillips – 6.40%.

Technical features
The reservoir consists of sandstones of Heimdal formation of Paleocene age, Lista Formation and has high viscosity.

Development history
Norsk Hydro and partners started development of the field in 1991. The Grane field started producing in September 2003. 31 production wells were put into operation.
The facility was designed by Aker Solutions Engineering in 2000–2003.

Production
In Grane oil field, Norsk Hydro used the technology applied its Troll and Oseberg fields to maximize production in Grane. From then on, the field supplied the market an average .
The company expects 55% recovery from the field. This makes Grane third of the size of Oseberg and twice the size of Brage. There is no gas cap in Grane field.

See also

Sture terminal
Heimdal gas field
Oseberg Transport System
Oseberg oil field
North Sea oil
Economy of Norway

References

External links
 Statoil official website

ConocoPhillips oil and gas fields
Equinor oil and gas fields
ExxonMobil oil and gas fields
North Sea oil fields
Oil fields in Norway